is a manga and anime series. Originally a seven volume manga by Megumi Tachikawa, the story was adapted into an anime television series by producer Tokyo Movie Shinsha, with forty-three episodes and one short, broadcast by ABC. Tokyopop translated the manga series, and subtitled and partially dubbed the anime series.

Video games were released for the Sega Saturn, Master System and Game Gear in Japan, and are considered collectors' items by Saint Tail fans.

The Tokyopop book summary states that it is "Robin Hood meets Sailor Moon!"

Plot

Middle school girl Meimi Haneoka transforms into the mysterious thief Saint Tail and steals back random belongings that were stolen using magic tricks. She's assisted by her best friend, classmate, and sister-in-training, Seira Mimori, whose position in the church after school each day allows her to hear the troubles of those who have been wronged and have come to pray to God.

While Saint Tail steals to right the wrongs done to innocent people, she's considered a thief by the police force. Her classmate, Daiki Asuka Jr.—called Asuka Jr.—and son of Detective Asuka, is hot on her trail. Saint Tail delivers notices of her planned capers to Asuka Jr., to give him a fair chance to catch her.

Media

Anime dubbing

The first four volumes (15 episodes) were dubbed to English as well as subtitled. Volumes 5-8 were released on DVD with English subtitles only. In the English dub, the first seven episodes removed references to God in a possible anticipation of a TV broadcast. This is especially awkward, "considering Seira Mimori spends half of the time in a nun's habit, one wonders why they thought they could do Saint Tail without references to God". According to producer Kenneth Lee, who took over starting with Volume 3, the remaining episodes will not have this restriction.

In the Italian dub, when Asuka Jr. reads a notice from Saint Tail, rather than display the notice written in Japanese, a short scene of Saint Tail running in the dark is shown while her voice reads out the notice's message. The notice scenes are cut from the Korean dub. In Korea, several episodes were cut entirely and not broadcast. Additionally, the twelfth episode was broadcast after the third episode to match with the real Christmas season.

Manga
Tokyopop licensed Saint Tail for an English-language translation in North America, and published it from April 23, 2001 to December 10, 2002. This translation has since gone out of print.

2017 contest
In 2017, Kodansha held a contest through pixiv for fans of Megumi Tachikawa's Saint Tail to become the artist for the "next generation" version of the manga. The contest asked fans to create the story of a new phantom thief who appears in Seika City.

References

External links

 
1994 manga
1995 anime television series debuts
Asahi Broadcasting Corporation original programming
Crime in anime and manga
Discotek Media
Fictional gentleman thieves
Game Gear games
Kodansha manga
Magical girl anime and manga
Master System games
Sega Saturn games
Shōjo manga
TMS Entertainment
TV Asahi original programming
Tokyopop titles
Tomy games
Video games developed in Japan